Virgin Steele is the eponymous debut album by New York heavy metal band Virgin Steele, released independently in 1982. This was the first album released by Music for Nations in Europe and was subsequently released by Mongol Horde Records and Maze Records in Canada. Music for Nations pressed 5,000 copies of the original LP. Sanctuary Records reissued the album on CD in 2002, with bonus tracks and some previously unreleased demos.

Track listing

2002 CD remaster

2018 CD remaster

Personnel

Virgin Steele
David DeFeis - vocals, keyboards, producer
Jack Starr - all guitars
Joe O'Reilly - bass
Joey Ayvazian - drums

Production
Alvaro Falcon - engineer
Steve Young - engineer, remastering

References

1982 debut albums
Music for Nations albums
Virgin Steele albums